Spin or spinning most often refers to:
 Spinning (textiles), the creation of yarn or thread by twisting fibers together, traditionally by hand spinning
 Spin, the rotation of an object around a central axis
 Spin (propaganda), an intentionally biased portrayal of something

Spin, spinning or spinnin may also refer to:

Physics and mathematics
 Spin, the rotation of an object around a central axis
 Spin (physics) or particle spin, a fundamental property of elementary particles
 Spin group, a particular double cover of the special orthogonal group SO(n)
 Spin tensor, a tensor quantity for describing spinning motion in special relativity and general relativity
 Spin (aerodynamics), autorotation of an aerodynamically stalled aeroplane
 SPIN bibliographic database, an indexing and abstracting service focusing on physics research

Textile arts 
 Spinning (polymers), a process for creating polymer fibres
 Spinning (textiles), the creation of yarn or thread by twisting fibers together
 Hand spinning, textile art to create yarn by hand

Sports
 Spin imparted on a ball in sports such as;
 Cue sports
 Pickleball
 Table tennis
 Tennis
 Indoor cycling, often called spinning, a form of exercise
Spinning (cycling), an indoor cycling brand
 Spinning (motorsport), a South African motorsport
 Figure skating spins, a number of different skating moves
 Poi spinning, a form of juggling
 Spin bowling, a type of bowling technique in cricket
 Spin fishing
 Pen spinning
 Spinning, a vertical-axis style of delivery in ten-pin bowling

Technology
 Metal spinning, the process of forming metal over a mandrel while rotating on a lathe
 Chevrolet Spin, a mini multi-purpose vehicle
 Fokker Spin, an aeroplane built by Anthony Fokker

Computing
 SPIN model checker, Gerard Holzmann's tool for formal verification of distributed software systems
 SPIN (operating system), a Mach-like OS written in Modula-3
 Spin (programming language), a high-level programming language
 SPIN (software process), a Software Process Improvement Network
 Busy waiting or spinning

Books and publications
 Spin (magazine), an American music website and former print magazine, 1985–present
 Spin (novel), a 2005 novel by Robert Charles Wilson
 Spinning (comics), a 2017 graphic novel memoir by Tillie Walden
 Spin, a 2004 novel by Martin Sixsmith 
 Spin, a fictional power in the Japanese manga series "JoJo's Bizarre Adventure", 1987–present

Businesses
 SPIN (cable system) or South Pacific Island Network
 Spin (company), an American scooter-sharing system
 SPiN, a chain of table tennis lounges

Film and TV

Films
 Spin (1995 film), a documentary film
 Spin (2003 film), a film by James Redford
 Spin, a 2010 short film by Max Hattler
 Spin (2015 film), a short film directed by Noah Workman and written by Wilson Cleveland
 Spin (2021 film), a film starring Avantika Vandanapu and directed by Manjari Makijany

Television
 "Spin" (Charlie Jade), a 2005 episode of the science fiction television program Charlie Jade
 "Spin" (House), a 2005 episode of the American medical drama television series House
 Spin, an anthropomorphic globe character that narrates the Really Wild Animals television series, 1993–1996

Music
 Spin (radio), a single play of a song
 Spinnin' Records, a Dutch electronic music label

Groups
 SPiN (band), an American alternative rock / power pop band
 Sp!n, a British rock band
 Spin, a Dutch funk band, an offshoot of Ekseption

Albums
 Spin (Darren Hayes album), 2002
 Spin (Tigers Jaw album), 2017
 Spin, a 1976 album by Spin, an offshoot band of Ekseption
 Spin, a 1985 album by Scullion
 Spin, a 2001 album by Eric Roche
 The Spin, a 1989 album by Yellowjackets

Songs
 "Spin" (song), a 2002 song by Lifehouse
 "Spin", a song by Trey Anastasio from the album Shine, 2005
 "Spin", a song by Taking Back Sunday from the album Louder Now, 2006

 "Spinning" (song), a 2021 song by No Rome, Charli XCX and the 1975
 "Spinning", a song by Christopher Cross and Valerie Carter from the album Christopher Cross, 1979
 "Spinning", a song by Jack's Mannequin from the album The Glass Passenger, 2008
 "Spinning", a song by Transatlantic from the album The Whirlwind, 2009
 "Spinnin, a song by Soul Asylum from the album And the Horse They Rode In On, 1990

Other uses
 Spin (b-boy move)
 Spinning (IPO), a form of financial bribery used by brokerages to gain corporate business
 Spins, a state of dizziness and disorientation due to intoxication ("the spins")
 Social Phobia Inventory or SPIN, a psychological test of social anxiety disorder
 Article spinning, a SEO approach of using equivalent phrases to rewrite articles
 Road agent's spin or "Curly Bill spin", a gunfighting maneuver utilized as a ruse when forced to surrender a side arm to an unfriendly party
 Wheelspin, spinning the wheels of a vehicle in place
 Spinnerbait
 Sufi spinning, a twirling meditation

See also 
 Flat spin (disambiguation)
 Spin-off (disambiguation)
 Spun (disambiguation)
 Tailspin (disambiguation)
 Twirling